Castanheiro (Portuguese meaning the chestnut tree) may refer to the following places in Portugal:

 Castanheiro, a civil parish in the municipality of Carrazeda de Ansiães
 Castanheiro do Sul, a civil parish in the municipality of São João da Pesqueira